Forsand is a village in Sandnes Municipality in Rogaland county, Norway. The Lysefjord Bridge is located just northeast of Forsand village and it crosses the Lysefjorden, connecting it to the small village of Oanes which sits on the north side of the fjord. The village of Høle is located across the Høgsfjorden to the west. Høle is connected to Forsand-Oanes by a regular ferry connection.

Prior to the merger in 2020, the village of Forsand was the administrative centre of Forsand Municipality which is now part of Sandnes Municipality.

The Lysefjord Bridge crosses the fjord to the north of the village. The village of Forsand has two grocery stores, the local government offices, Forsand Church, and Forsand School.

References

Villages in Rogaland
Sandnes